José de Jesus Peixoto Camargo (born August 6, 1946), or simply J.J. Camargo, is a Brazilian thoracic surgeon, writer and lecturer. He graduated from  the Federal University of Rio Grande do Sul in 1970 and specialised in thoracic surgery from the Mayo Clinic. Currently (2022), he is a professor at the Federal University of Health Sciences of Porto Alegre.

Dr. J.J. Camargo and his team performed the first ever lung transplantation in Brazil and Latin America in 1989; as well as the first ever double lung transplant in Brazil. He and his team hold the record for the most lung transplants in the country. Sixty percent of lung transplants performed in Brazil during 2015 are attributed to Dr. J.J. Camargo and his team.

Books 
 Camargo, José J. (2000). Cirurgia torácica. Mais de 120 questões de múltipla escolha com respostas comentadas. Rio de Janeiro: Revinter. 146 páginas. 
 Eduardo Garcia (org.), José J. Camargo (org.) (2003.). Histórias Médicas. Porto Alegre: Ed. da ISCMPA. 149 páginas. 
 Camargo, José J. (2008). Não pensem por mim. reflexões e histórias de um médico. Porto Alegre: AGE Ed. 213 páginas. 
 Gomes, Nilton Haertel; Orientador: Jose J. Camargo (1990). Tratamento de hidatidose pulmonar. uma opção cirúrgica. [S.l.: s.n.] 87 páginas

References

Brazilian thoracic surgeons
1946 births
Living people